Red tourism is a subset of domestic and international tourism in current or former 'red' countries such as China and Russia in which people visit locations with historical significance to their "red" past.

In China, Chinese people visit locations with historical significance to Chinese Communism "to rekindle their long-lost sense of class struggle and proletarian principles." The Government began actively supporting red tourism in 2005 to promote the "national ethos" and socioeconomic development in those areas, which are typically rural and poorer than East China. The “General Plan for the Development of Red Tourism in 2004-2010” (2004－2010年全国红色旅游发展规划纲要) was issued by the General Office of the Chinese Communist Party and the General Office of the State Council, it established the first batch of 100 so-called "red tourism classic scenic spots (红色旅游经典景区)". In July 2010, officials representing 13 Chinese cities signed a "China Red Tourism Cities Strategic Cooperation Yan'an Declaration" to develop red tourism; the cities are: Guang'an, Yan'an, Xiangtan, Jinggangshan, Ruijin, Zunyi, Baise, Shijiazhuang, Linyi, Anyang, Yulin, Qingyang, and Huining.  A Chinese official said "This is a major project that benefits both the Party, the nation and the people, either in the economic, cultural and the political sense."

Locations
The number of red tourism sites has continuously grown since its inception in 2005. Several plans for developing red tourism were implemented in all provinces of the PRC, as highlighted in the project Topography of Red Memories in Modern China.
Gutian, site of the  Gutian Congress, where Mao Zedong stamped out "ultra-democracy" (voting among Red Army members). The resolution in the conference stipulated the basic principles for building the Party and the army.
Yan'an,  near the endpoint of the Long March, and thus became the center of the Chinese communist revolution from 1936 to 1948. Chinese communists celebrate Yan'an as the birthplace of the revolution. Tourists can participate in daily mock battles portraying “The Defense of Yan’an” against Chinese Nationalist Army forces.
Jinggangshan, the cradle of the Chinese Communist revolution, where Mao Zedong and other leading members of the Chinese Communist Party established the first rural base for the revolution in 1927.
Zunyi,  the site of the Zunyi Conference
Japanese Germ Warfare Experimental Base in Harbin
 Xifeng Concentration Camp
Shaoshan, the birthplace of Mao Zedong 
Hainan Island
Nanjie, Henan province: Small village where its local residents still live under Maoist ideas and live according to commune principles.
Shanghai: Site of the 1921 Communist meeting.
Nanchang, Jiangxi Province: Site of the BaYi Uprising (August 1, 1927).
Chongqing: Communist sites from WWII.
Ruijin, Jiangxi Province: Headquarters of the Communist Party in the early 1930s.
Tingzhou, Fujian, where leaders of the Communist Party such as Mao Zedong and Zhou Enlai took refuge during the early years of the civil war.

Outside China
Other former Communist countries can have red tourism, such as the Czech Republic, previously part of Czechoslovakia and ruled by the Communist Party of Czechoslovakia. Recently, Russian researchers started to focus on the studying of the trend of Russian-Chinese tourism’ development.

Events
The China Red Tourism and Cultural Festival is held annually in Hunan. The 2010 Festival took place in July and took advantage of high-speed rail in China.

Criticism
Aging original members of the Red Army criticise the "Disneyfication" of what should be solemn war memorials.

References

Further reading
Yiping Li; Zhi Yi Hu; Chao Zhi Zhang. Red tourism: sustaining communist identity in a rapidly changing China.  Journal of Tourism and Cultural Change, Volume 8, Issue 1 & 2 March 2010, pages 101 - 119.

External links
Topography of Red Memories in Modern China
Red Tourism slideshow at newyorktimes.com
Dan Chung, Red Tourism in China slideshow at guardian.co.uk

Tourism in China
Marxism–Leninism